Paris By Night 89: In Korea is a Paris By Night program that was filmed at the Olympic Fencing Gymnasium at the Olympic Park in Seoul, South Korea on Sunday, July 1, 2007. It is Thúy Nga's first venture into Asia to tape a Paris By Night program. Thúy Nga chose to tape at South Korea, rather than any other country in Asia simply because of the popularity of Korean actors and singers to the Vietnamese community.  The program is directed by a Korean director, Seounghyun Oh.  It is Thúy Nga's fourth "Live" show.

The venue, the Olympic Fencing Gymnasium (or the Olympic Fencing Stadium), is one of Thúy Nga's biggest stages to date.  Seating about 6,350 people, the audience consists normally of native Vietnamese people who traveled directly from Thúy Nga's native country of Vietnam.  The audience also consists of those who participated in Thúy Nga's first ever Summer Asia Tour, sponsored directly from Thúy Nga.  The tour is about a week long, and includes seats to the taping of this show. The venue features two stages, and is one of Thúy Nga's biggest shows of this year.

The program also features models from both from Vietnam and South Korea actresses and models.  At the end of the program, the DVD features the hosts, Nguyễn Ngọc Ngạn and Nguyễn Cao Kỳ Duyên, documenting Vietnamese refugee life in South Korea after the Fall of Saigon.

Track list

Disc 1

01. Đừng Hứa Với Em - Minh Tuyết

02. Bao Giờ Em Mới Hiểu? - Trịnh Lam

03. Nửa Hồn Thương Đau - Ý Lan

04. Đường Vào Yêu - Thủy Tiên

05. Xót Xa - Mai Quốc Huy

06. Phỏng Vấn Mai Quốc Huy

07. Superstar - Vân Quỳnh, Hương Giang

08. Thiên Đàng Đánh Mất - Dương Triệu Vũ

09. Tân Cổ : Bạc Trắng Lửa Hồng - Hương Thủy, Mạnh Quỳnh

10. Hai Quê - Quang Lê

11. Phỏng Vấn Quang Lê

12. Thôi Nhớ Mong Mà Chi - Bảo Hân

13. Phỏng vấn Khánh Ly

14. Hoa Vàng Mấy Độ - Khánh Ly

15. Hạ Trắng - Trần Thái Hòa

16. Clip : Nguồn Gốc Họ Lý Hoa Sơn - Korea

17. Phỏng Vấn Trưởng Hậu Duệ Nhà Họ Lý

18. Tan Biến (Gone) - Huỳnh Gia Tuấn, Roni Trọng

19. Hài Kịch : Giọt Lệ Ðài Trang - Hoài Linh, Chí Tài, Hữu Lộc

Phóng sự Ðặc Biệt Tại Ðại Hàn Với Nguyễn Ngọc Ngạn & Nguyễn Cao Kỳ Duyên:

 Tiến sĩ Yeon Kwan Park
 Những Mảnh Ðời Buồn Vui...
 Linh mục Phạm Thanh Bình

Disc 2

01. Liên Khúc : Gió Bắc & Lý Con Sáo Bạc Liêu - Tâm Ðoan, Hương Lan

02. Em Vẫn Tin - Hồ Lệ Thu

03. Mưa Trên Quê Hương - Như Quỳnh

04. Clip : Thuyền Trưởng Jeon Je Yong Cứu Thuyền Nhân Việt Nam

05. Vinh Danh Thuyền Trưởng Jeon Je Yong

06. Cơn Đau Cuối Cùng - Lương Tùng Quang

07. Phỏng vấn Lương Tùng Quang

08. Yêu Để Rồi Biết Xót Xa - David Meng

09. Yêu Anh Thật Khó Nói - Như Loan, Loan Châu

10. Phỏng vấn Như Loan, Loan Châu

11. Mộng Sầu - Khánh Hà

12. Linh Hồn Đã Mất - Bằng Kiều

13. Phỏng vấn Bằng Kiều

14. Trình Diễn Áo Dài Calvin Hiệp (8 Người Mẫu Việt Nam) & Thái Nguyễn (8 Người Mẫu Ðại Hàn) / Nhạc Nền : Ảo Ảnh - Trần Thu Hà

15. Hoa Nắng - Sunny Lương, Mai Tiến Dũng

16. Hoang Vu - Thế Sơn

17. Tình Chấp Nhận - Quỳnh Vi

18. Khi Anh Ra Đi - Lưu Bích

19. Finale

Bonus MTV :
Nếu Em Ðược Chọn Lựa - Ngọc Liên
Chuyện Ngày Thơ - Hà Phương
Em Vẫn Tin - Hồ Lệ Thu

Paris by Night

vi:Paris By Night 89